Roman Teryushkov (born 20 December 1979, Moscow) is a Russian political figure, a deputy of the 8th State Duma, and a former Minister of Physical Culture and Sports of the Moscow Oblast. 

From 2002 to 2005, Teryushkov worked as a financial analyst and, later, as the head of the financial department of Ecoreserve LLC. In 2006-2007, he was the deputy chief of the Young Guard of United Russia. From 2007 to 2009, Teryushkov was the head of the department of mass youth programs and, later, the Deputy Head of the Central Headquarters of the Young Guard of United Russia. In 2012-2013, he headed the Golovinsky District. From 2014 to 2021, he was the Minister of Physical Culture and Sports of the Moscow Oblast. Since September 2021, he has served as deputy of the 8th State Duma.

References

1979 births
Living people
United Russia politicians
21st-century Russian politicians
Eighth convocation members of the State Duma (Russian Federation)